James Lord may refer to:
 James Lord (author) (1922–2009), American writer
 James Lord (bobsleigh), American bobsledder
 James Lord (unionist) (born 1879), English-born American labor unionist
 James Brown Lord (1859–1902), American architect
 James S. Lord (1875–1932), Canadian politician
 Jim Lord (1948–2008), American lawyer and politician from Minnesota
 Jim Lord (singer-songwriter) (born 1948), American singer-songwriter